PAST is a large-scale, distributed, persistent storage system based on the Pastry peer-to-peer overlay network.

See also
 Pastry (DHT) (PAST section)

External links
 A. Rowstron and P. Druschel. Storage management and caching in PAST, a large-scale, persistent peer-to-peer storage utility. 18th ACM SOSP'01, Lake Louise, Alberta, Canada, October 2001.
 PAST homepages: freepastry.org, Microsoft Research
 http://www.cse.lehigh.edu/~brian/course/advanced-networking/reviews/weber-past.html
 http://ieeexplore.ieee.org/xpl/abs_free.jsp?arNumber=990064 IEEE

Distributed data storage